Pawłówko may refer to the following places:
Pawłówko, Grodzisk Wielkopolski County in Greater Poland Voivodeship (west-central Poland)
Pawłówko, Ciechanów County in Masovian Voivodeship (east-central Poland)
Pawłówko, Przasnysz County in Masovian Voivodeship (east-central Poland)
Pawłówko, Gmina Buk in Greater Poland Voivodeship (west-central Poland)
Pawłówko, Chojnice County in Pomeranian Voivodeship (north Poland)
Pawłówko, Człuchów County in Pomeranian Voivodeship (north Poland)